"Bounce" is a song by Scottish DJ Calvin Harris. The song features American singer Kelis and is a move away from Harris singing, concentrating more on production. It was released on 10 June 2011 as the first single from Harris's third studio album, 18 Months (2012).

Background
In November 2010, Harris claimed that he would no longer be singing on his tracks. He said, "I've stopped the live shows. I'm going to focus more on production and DJing and zero per cent of my time will go on singing. I'll do tracks with people who can sing well – proper artists, proper performers. I can focus on what I'm much better at, which is making music. I'm just not cut out for that role. I kind of fell into it a few years ago – the live show had to happen, I had to be the frontman because I was doing the vocals on the songs. It went all right. I spent a few years trying to get it really properly good, but it dawned on me it wasn't going to get much better. I've taken the singing thing as far as I can."

"Bounce" marked Harris's first single on which he did not provide the vocals. The song premiered on Annie Mac's show on BBC Radio 1 on 29 April 2011.

After the release of "Bounce", Harris released his follow-up single, "Feel So Close", and despite saying he would not be providing the vocals on his tracks, he returned to singing on the song.

Critical reception
"Bounce" received generally positive reviews from contemporary critics. Lewis Corner from Digital Spy noted the successful transition of Harris's lack of vocals for the song saying "Kelis purrs over a midi-fied melody reminiscent of a classic Game Boy, before Harris takes the reins on the vocal-less chorus complete with bang-on-trend squiggly synths and head-bopping beats". Michael Cragg from The Guardian noted the club effect of the track saying "Opening with a pinging keyboard riff and Kelis intoning 'bounce', it soon morphs into a hands-in-the-air-ideally-holding-a-glow-stick dance monster, with Kelis's effortless cool keeping it's just the right side of parody." Sarah Deen from Metro noted the "hands-in-the-air chorus" but added "a marked improvement from his first single 'Merrymaking at My Place' but it's no 'I'm Not Alone'."

Chart performance
"Bounce" first appeared on the UK Singles Chart at number two on 19 June 2011, behind Example's "Changed the Way You Kiss Me", despite appearing at number one on the mid-week update; this would be its highest-chart position. The single marked Harris's sixth top 10 single in the UK and the third most successful of these, behind "I'm Not Alone" and "Dance wiv Me"; both of which reached number-one. "Bounce" also marked the tenth top 10 single on the UK Singles Chart for Kelis. The single peaked at number one in Harris's native Scotland, becoming his third number one on the chart.

Music video
The official music video was directed by Vincent Haycock. It premiered on Harris's Vevo channel in May 2011. The video features a cameo from Kelis as herself and American model AJ English, and was filmed in Las Vegas, Nevada, United States.

Track listings
CD single
"Bounce"  – 3:42
"Bounce"  – 5:23
"Bounce"  – 5:36

Digital download
"Bounce"  – 3:42
"Awooga" – 7:13
"Bounce"  – 6:00

Digital download – Remixes
"Bounce"  – 5:36
"Bounce"  – 5:23
"Bounce"  – 6:43
"Bounce"  – 6:06

Maxi-single
 "Bounce"  – 3:42
 "Bounce"  – 5:59
 "Bounce"  – 6:06
 "Bounce"  – 5:27
 "Bounce"  – 5:39
 "Bounce"  – 6:46
 "Awooga" – 7:13

Charts

Weekly charts

Year-end charts

Certifications

Release history

References

2011 singles
Calvin Harris songs
Kelis songs
Songs written by Calvin Harris
Number-one singles in Scotland